Copuetta is a genus of African corinnid sac spiders first described by C. R. Haddad in 2013.

Species
 it contains thirteen species:
Copuetta comorica Haddad, 2013 – Comoros
Copuetta erecta Haddad, 2013 – Mozambique, South Africa
Copuetta kakamega Haddad, 2013 – Kenya
Copuetta kwamgumi Haddad, 2013 – Tanzania
Copuetta lacustris (Strand, 1916) – Central, East, Southern Africa
Copuetta lesnei Haddad, 2013 – Mozambique
Copuetta litipo Haddad, 2013 – Tanzania
Copuetta lotzi Haddad, 2013 – South Africa
Copuetta magna Haddad, 2013 – Tanzania, Mozambique, South Africa
Copuetta maputa Haddad, 2013 (type) – Mozambique, South Africa
Copuetta naja Haddad, 2013 – Tanzania
Copuetta uzungwa Haddad, 2013 – Tanzania
Copuetta wagneri Haddad, 2013 – Uganda

References

Araneomorphae genera
Corinnidae
Spiders of Africa